Car Trouble may refer to:

Books
Car Trouble (Jeanne DuPrau novel), 2005

Film and TV
Car Trouble (film), 1985 film starring Julie Walters

TV
"Car Trouble", a 2003 episode of Teen Titans
"Car Trouble", a 1998 episode of Malcolm & Eddie
"Car Trouble", a 2003 episode of Kim Possible

Music

Songs
"Car Trouble" by Adam and the Ants from the album Dirk Wears White Sox (1979)
"Car Trouble" by J-Live from the EP Always Will Be (2003)
"Car Trouble" by Ennio Morricone from the soundtrack to The Secret of the Sahara (1973)
"Car Trouble" by Jerry Goldsmith from the soundtrack to Looney Tunes: Back in Action (2003)
"Car Trouble" by All Girl Summer Fun Band
"Car Trouble" by Thomas Newman from the film Pay It Forward (2000)
"Car Trouble" by HammerFall
"Car Trouble" by The Jerky Boys from Best of the Jerky Boys (2002)
"Car Trouble" by Alicia Myers from Alicia Again (1981)